Crimsinota is a genus of butterflies in the family Lycaenidae. It is a synonym of Nicolaea Johnson, 1993 

Lycaenidae
Lycaenidae genera